A D-Girl is a development girl.

It can also refer to: 
 "D-Girl (DopeGirl)", a song by American R&B singer Brooke Valentine
 "D-Girl" (The Sopranos episode)
 D-Girl, a Law %26 Order (season 7) episode